Atlético Madrid is a Spanish football club based in Madrid, who currently play in La Liga. The club was founded in 1903.

They are one of the most successful clubs in Spanish football, having won ten Championship titles and ten Copa del Rey titles. They have won seven European titles: the UEFA Cup Winners' Cup in 1962, the UEFA Europa League in 2010, 2012 and 2018, and the UEFA Super Cup in 2010, 2012 and 2018. They also won the Intercontinental Cup in 1974.

This is a list of its notable players. Generally, this means players that have played 100 or more official matches for the club. However, some players who have played fewer matches are also included; this includes some players who fell just short of the 100 total and players who made significant contributions to the club's history.

Players
Nationality column refers to the country (countries) represented internationally by the player, if any.

Statistics correct as of 23 August 2021.

Captains

Atletico Madrid
Players
 
Association football player non-biographical articles